The Azhdar Show is a live Kurdish variety program hosted by the pop star, singer and entertainer Azhdar Wahbi in Kurdistan. The show features interviews and performances by Azhdar and his guests. The show has been on the air since October 2009 and airs every Friday night on Korek TV.

External links 
 Official website
 Clip from Azhdar Show
 https://karwan.tv/korek-tv.html

Kurdish-language television
Variety television series